Department of Transportation v. Public Citizen, 541 U.S. 752 (2004), is a case argued in the Supreme Court of the United States on 21 April 2004. The question the case presented relates to Presidential foreign affairs and foreign trade Actions exempt from environmental-review requirements under the National Environmental Policy Act and the Clean Air Act. Specifically, the question is whether those Actions are subject to those requirements as a result of a rulemaking action concerning motor carrier safety by the federal agency with responsibility for that type of safety.

See also
List of United States Supreme Court cases, volume 541
List of United States Supreme Court cases

Further reading

External links

United States Supreme Court cases
United States Supreme Court cases of the Rehnquist Court
United States environmental case law
2004 in the environment
2004 in United States case law
United States Department of Transportation
Public Citizen